The Kouchibouguacis River is a river in Saint-Louis Parish, Kent County, New Brunswick, Canada. It is a tributary of the Northumberland Strait.

River Communities
Saint-Louis-de-Kent
Kent Junction
Saint-Ignace

River Crossings
Route 11
Route 126
Route 134

See also
List of rivers of New Brunswick

References

Rivers of New Brunswick